The 2021 BWF World Senior Championships (officially known as the  ElPozo BWF World Senior Championships 2021 for sponsorship reasons) is a badminton tournament which held from 28 November to 4 December 2021 at  in Huelva, Spain.

Participants

Medal summary

Medal table

Medalists

References

External links 
Tournament link

BWF World Senior Championships
2021 in badminton
2021 in Spanish sport
International sports competitions hosted by Spain
Badminton tournaments in Spain
BWF World Senior Championships
BWF World Senior Championships